Kongnamul-bulgogi (literally "soybean sprout bulgogi"), sometimes abbreviated as kongbul (kong for kongnamul and bul for bulgogi), is a modern Korean dish. It is a combination of bulgogi, bean sprouts, rice cake, vegetables, noodles, sausages, and spicy sauce. The ingredients are roasted in a large pan.
The dish has become increasingly popular in South Korea, especially among teenagers, due to its low price and appealing flavour.

History
Kongnamul-bulgogi restaurants thrived in Jeonju during the 1980s. The dish enjoyed a resurgence with the success of the Kongbul restaurant franchise, which opened in 2008.

Preparation

Pork, bean sprouts, onions, red peppers, scallions, and perilla leaves are needed as the main ingredients. Additionally, in order to make the sauce, gochujang (고추장, red pepper paste), Korean plum extract from Prunus mume (매실액), oyster sauce, and crushed garlic (다진마늘) are commonly used. A mixture of the sauce, bean sprouts, and cooked pork completes the dish.

Variations
The original Kongbul is a combination of the sauce, bean sprouts, and pork. However, there are several variations to this recipe. For example, squid or chicken can be added, and the spicy sauce can be replaced by a sweet one. Additionally, rice cakes, boiled eggs, noodles, dumplings, ham, and cheese are options for any type of Kongbul.

See also

 Bulgogi
 Korean cuisine
 Kimchi
 Gochujang

References

Meat dishes
Vegetable dishes
Korean cuisine